The word shite may refer to:
A variation of shit, especially in the Republic of Ireland and the United Kingdom
The shite, the principal character in a Japanese Noh play
Shite, the person who performs the technique in aikido

See also
Shi'ite
Scheidt (disambiguation)